The 1979 French Open was a tennis tournament that took place on the outdoor clay courts at the Stade Roland Garros in Paris, France. The tournament ran from 28 May until 10 June. It was the 83rd staging of the French Open, and the first Grand Slam tennis event of 1979.

Finals

Men's singles 

 Björn Borg defeated  Víctor Pecci, 6–3, 6–1, 6–7(6–8), 6–4 
It was Borg's 7th career Grand Slam title, and his 4th French Open title.

Women's singles

 Chris Evert-Lloyd defeated  Wendy Turnbull, 6–2, 6–0 
It was Evert's 9th career Grand Slam title, and her 3rd French Open title.

Men's doubles

 Gene Mayer /  Sandy Mayer defeated  Ross Case /  Phil Dent, 6–4, 6–4, 6–4

Women's doubles

 Betty Stöve /  Wendy Turnbull defeated  Françoise Dürr /  Virginia Wade, 3–6, 7–5, 6–4

Mixed doubles

 Wendy Turnbull /  Bob Hewitt defeated  Virginia Ruzici /  Ion Țiriac, 6–3, 2–6, 6–1

Prize money

Total prize money for the event was FF2,050,012.

References

External links
 French Open official website

 
1979 Grand Prix (tennis)
1979 in French tennis
1979 in Paris